WVMY may refer to:

 WVMY-LD, a low-power television station (channel 8) licensed to serve Parkersburg, West Virginia, United States
 WDMY-LD, a low-power television station (channel 6, virtual 23) licensed to serve Toledo, Ohio, United States, which held the call sign WVMY-LP in 2017